Kaveh Mousavi (born 27 May 1985 in Urmia) is an Iranian athlete. He competed for Iran in hammer throw at the 2012 Summer Olympics.

His has a personal best of 77.40 meters achieved in Belarus on 8 July 2016 which is the current Iranian record. The record was thrown three before the end of the Rio Olympics qualification period. The date and the unclear circumstances of the throw have led to questions of the validity of the result and IAAF board member Antti Pihlakoski has stated he will investigate the issue.

Competition record

References

External links
IAAF profile

Iranian hammer throwers
Athletes (track and field) at the 2012 Summer Olympics
Olympic athletes of Iran
1985 births
Living people
People from Urmia
Asian Games silver medalists for Iran
Athletes (track and field) at the 2010 Asian Games
Athletes (track and field) at the 2014 Asian Games
Athletes (track and field) at the 2016 Summer Olympics
Iranian male athletes
Male hammer throwers
Medalists at the 2010 Asian Games
Asian Games medalists in athletics (track and field)
Competitors at the 2009 Summer Universiade
Competitors at the 2011 Summer Universiade